The Twin Bridges-West Paden Covered Bridge No. 121 is a historic wooden covered bridge located at Fishing Creek Township in Columbia County, Pennsylvania. It crosses the Huntington Creek. It is one of 28 historic covered bridges in Columbia and Montour Counties. It is a twin of the Twin Bridges-East Paden Covered Bridge No. 120.

It was listed on the National Register of Historic Places in 1979. The bridge was destroyed in a flood on June 28, 2006, and an identical replacement was built and dedicated on October 15, 2008.

References 

Covered bridges on the National Register of Historic Places in Pennsylvania
Covered bridges in Columbia County, Pennsylvania
Bridges completed in 1850
Wooden bridges in Pennsylvania
Bridges in Columbia County, Pennsylvania
National Register of Historic Places in Columbia County, Pennsylvania
Road bridges on the National Register of Historic Places in Pennsylvania
Burr Truss bridges in the United States
Buildings and structures destroyed by flooding
Rebuilt buildings and structures in the United States